Evodinus lanhami is a species of beetle in the family Cerambycidae. It was described by Lewis in 1976.

References

Lepturinae
Beetles described in 1976